Marco Soares may refer to:

 Marco Soares (footballer)  (born 1984), Cape Verdean footballer
 Marco Soares (volleyball)  (born 1971), Portuguese volleyball player

See also
 Marco Soares (disambiguation)